Cretamystilus (meaning "Cretaceous Mystilus") is an extinct genus of mirid insect in the tribe Mecistoscelini known from a fossil preserved in a piece of Cenomanian (Late Cretaceous) Burmese amber from the Hukawng Valley, Myanmar. Cretamystilus, which was the first extinct genus to be named in 2021, contains a single species, C. herczeki. Cretamystilus is the first member of the Miridae in the fossil record known to date. It probably had a host association with bamboo plants, which is only hypothesized, and morphological characters of the holotype and similarity to the extant genus Mystilus (Distant, 1904) are also present in Cretamystilus.

References 

Miridae
Prehistoric insect genera
Cretaceous insects
Cenomanian life
Burmese amber
Fossil taxa described in 2021